Jack Kolle (29 March 1918–12 September 2001), better known as Jack Samuels, was an Indonesian football defender who played for the Dutch East Indies in the 1938 FIFA World Cup. He also played for Excelsior Soerabaja.

References

External links
 

Indonesian footballers
Indonesia international footballers
Association football defenders
1938 FIFA World Cup players
Sportspeople from Surabaya